Cecil Morton York (29 April 1857 – 23 February 1935) was a British actor of the silent era.

Born Cecil Morton Smith in Kensington, West London, UK, he died at age 77 in Denville Hall, Northwood, London.

Selected filmography
 Flying from Justice (1915)
 Disraeli (1916)
 Beau Brocade (1916)
 The Key of the World (1918)
The First Men In The Moon (1919) as the Grand Lunar
 Pallard the Punter (1919)
 The Autumn of Pride (1921)
 The God in the Garden (1921)
 Trapped by the Mormons (1922)
 A Sister to Assist 'Er (1922)
 A Gamble with Hearts (1923)
 The Starlit Garden (1923)
 Hornet's Nest (1923)
 In the Blood (1923)
 What Price Loving Cup? (1923)
 Lights of London (1923)
 Young Lochinvar (1923)
 The Uninvited Guest (1923)
 Old Bill Through the Ages (1924)
 The Alley of Golden Hearts (1924)
 What the Butler Saw (1924)
 Trainer and Temptress (1925)

References

External links

1857 births
1935 deaths
English male film actors
English male silent film actors
Male actors from London
20th-century English male actors